Matías Oscar Fissore (born 21 September 1990) is an Argentine professional footballer.

Career

Atletico Rafaela 
Fissore made his debut for Atlético de Rafaela in 2010 in the Primera B Nacional. Between 2010 and his departure in 2015, Fissore played 106 matches, 71 of which were in the Primera División.

San Martin de San Juan 
In June 2015, Fissore joined San Martín de San Juan on a free transfer.

Oakland Roots
On 4 March 2021, Fissore joined USL Championship side Oakland Roots. He left Oakland following their 2022 season.

Honours
 Atlético Rafaela 2010-2011 (Primera B Nacional Championship)

Personal life
He is a cousin of the footballer Martín Romagnoli.

References

External links
 Profile at BDFA  
 
 

1990 births
Living people
Argentine footballers
Atlético de Rafaela footballers
San Martín de San Juan footballers
San Martín de Tucumán footballers
Argentine Primera División players
Primera Nacional players
Association football midfielders
Oakland Roots SC players
Argentine expatriate sportspeople in the United States
Expatriate soccer players in the United States
Argentine expatriate footballers
21st-century Argentine people